Mário Filipovič (born 7 May 1976) is a Slovak sport shooter who specializes in the trap.

At the 2008 Olympic Games he finished in joint thirteenth place in the trap qualification, missing a place among the top six, who progressed to the final round.

References

1976 births
Living people
Slovak male sport shooters
Shooters at the 2008 Summer Olympics
Olympic shooters of Slovakia
Trap and double trap shooters